Salt and pepper is the common name for edible salt and ground black pepper, which are ubiquitously paired on Western dining tables as to allow for the additional seasoning of food after its preparation. During food preparation or cooking, they may also be added in combination.

Salt and pepper are typically maintained in separate shakers on the table, but they may be mixed in the kitchen. They are typically found in a set (pair), often a matched set, of salt and pepper shakers. They may be considered condiments or seasonings; salt is a mineral and black pepper is a spice.

History 
The pairing of salt and pepper as table accessories dates to seventeenth-century French cuisine, which considered black pepper (distinct from herbs such as fines herbes) the only spice that did not overpower the true taste of food. Some food writers like Sara Dickerman have argued that, in modern cookery, a new spice could be used in place of the historic ground black pepper.

Other cultures 
In Hungary, paprika may replace pepper on the dinner table, while in Basque cuisine, Espelette pepper frequently replaces black pepper.

References

Condiments